Free and Equal is a live album by English saxophonist John Surman featuring American drummer Jack DeJohnette and the London Brass recorded in Queen Elizabeth Hall in London in 2001 and released on the ECM label.

Reception
The Allmusic review by Alain Drouot awarded the album 3½ stars, stating, "Free and Equal finds its place somewhere between John Surman's past collaborations with Jack DeJohnette and his Brass Project with composer Peter Warren. Less atmospheric than the duos with the drummer and less jazzy than the latter, it still bears the inimitable stamp of the British reed player. It harks back to his pastoral and even medieval leanings and his arranging skills certainly capture the spotlight, his lyrical and often fragile compositions soaring with incredible grace".

Track listing
All compositions by John Surman.

 "Preamble" – 4:11   
 "Groundwork" – 9:33   
 "Sea Change" – 10:14   
 "Back and Forth" – 11:51   
 "Fire" – 6:47 
 "Debased Line" – 5:02 
 "In the Shadow" – 6:56   
 "Free and Equal" – 8:47   
 "Epilogue" – 3:42

Personnel 
 John Surman – soprano saxophone, baritone saxophone, bass clarinet
 Jack DeJohnette – drums, piano
 London Brass – trumpet, flugelhorn, horn, trombone, euphonium, tuba

References 

ECM Records live albums
John Surman live albums
Jack DeJohnette live albums
2003 live albums
Albums produced by Manfred Eicher